Eliza Jane Pratt (March 5, 1902 – May 13, 1981) was a U.S. Representative from North Carolina, the first woman to represent her state in the U.S. Congress.

She was the only woman elected to the U.S. House from North Carolina until the 1992 election of Eva Clayton.

Pratt was born in Anson County, North Carolina on March 5, 1902. She attended Queens College in Charlotte, North Carolina from 1918 to 1920.

In 1923, Pratt worked as an editor for the Montgomerian newspaper in Troy, North Carolina. In 1924, she was hired as an administrative assistant for Congressman William C. Hammer. Following Hammer's death in 1930, Pratt worked for a succession of North Carolina representatives: Hinton James, J. Walter Lambeth and William O. Burgin.

When Burgin died in office in 1946, Pratt was elected as a Democrat to fill the vacancy. She served from May 25, 1946, to January 3, 1947, and was not a candidate in the 1946 general election. During her time in office, Pratt was appointed to three committees: Pensions, Territories, and Flood Control.

Pratt went on to a variety of federal government jobs between 1947 and 1956 with the Office of Alien Property, the Agriculture Department, and the Library of Congress. She worked as secretary for another member of Congress, Alvin Paul Kitchin, from 1957 through 1962. In 1962, Pratt returned to North Carolina and worked as a public relations executive for the North Carolina Telephone Company.

See also

 Women in the United States House of Representatives

References

External links
Congressional Biography
 

1902 births
1981 deaths
20th-century American politicians
20th-century American women politicians
Female members of the United States House of Representatives
Democratic Party members of the United States House of Representatives from North Carolina
Women in North Carolina politics
Editors of North Carolina newspapers
Queens University of Charlotte alumni
People from Wadesboro, North Carolina
Secretaries
United States congressional aides